Artemus may refer to:

Artemus, Kentucky
Nick Allen (catcher) or Artemus Ward "Nick" Allen (1888–1939), American baseball player
Artemus de Almeida (born 1969), Brazilian equestrian
Artemus Gates (1895–1976), American politician
Artemus Gordon, a character on the TV series The Wild Wild West
Artemus Libbey (1823–1894), Justice of the Maine Supreme Judicial Court
Artemus Ogletree (died 1935), American victim of an unsolved murder
Artemus Ward (1834–1867), American humorist
Artemus E. Weatherbee (1918–1995), U.S. Department of the Treasury official

Redirect
Artemas (disambiguation)
Artemis (disambiguation)